Area code 951 is a California telephone area code that was split from area code 909 on July 17, 2004. It covers western Riverside County, including the cities and communities of Banning, Beaumont, Corona, Canyon Lake, Riverside, Temescal Valley, Woodcrest, Moreno Valley, Perris, Menifee, Lake Elsinore, Wildomar, Murrieta, Temecula, San Jacinto, Hemet, Lakeview, Nuevo, Norco, Eastvale, Jurupa Valley, and Idyllwild.

History
Until November 14, 1992, the area covered by 951 was part of area code 714.

Area code 951 is currently the last new area code in California to have been split from another one.  All codes introduced in the state since have been overlays.

Prior to October 2021, area code 951 had telephone numbers assigned for the central office code 988. In 2020, 988 was designated nationwide as a dialing code for the National Suicide Prevention Lifeline, which created a conflict for exchanges that permit seven-digit dialing. This area code was therefore scheduled to transition to ten-digit dialing by October 24, 2021.

List of cities and communities in the 951 area code

Riverside County

Aguanga
Anza
Banning
Beaumont
Cabazon
Calimesa
Canyon Lake
Cherry Valley
Corona
East Hemet
Eastvale
Hemet
Highgrove
Home Gardens
Homeland
Idyllwild-Pine Cove
Jurupa Valley
Lake Elsinore
Lakeland Village
Lakeview
March Air Reserve Base
Menifee
Moreno Valley
Murrieta
Norco
Nuevo
Perris
Riverside
San Jacinto
Temecula
Valle Vista
Wildomar
Winchester

San Bernardino County

Colton
Fontana
Grand Terrace

See also
List of California area codes
List of NANP area codes
North American Numbering Plan

References

External links 
North American Numbering Plan Administration
Map
 List of exchanges from AreaCodeDownload.com, 951 Area Code

 Maps and Lists of area codes, also in Spanish and in French

951
Riverside County, California
Inland Empire
Telecommunications-related introductions in 2004
951